Ur-Ningirsu (Sumerian: , Ur-D-nin-gir-su) also Ur-Ningirsu II in contrast with the earlier Ur-Ningirsu I, was a Sumerian ruler (ensi) of the state of Lagash in Southern Mesopotamia who ruled c. 2110 BC. He was the son of the previous ruler of Lagash named Gudea.

Statue of Ur-Ningirsu
A statue of Ur-Ningirsu, dedicated to Ningishzida (Sumerian: , DNin-ḡiš-zi-da), is shared by The Metropolitan Museum of Art of New York, and the Musée du Louvre, as they own separately the head and the body of the statue, respectively. The statue has an inscription in the back, which reads:

Other objects and inscriptions
Also found was a foundation cone describing Ur-Ningirsu's construction of several temples.

References

Sources

 

22nd-century BC Sumerian kings
Kings of Lagash